The United States Naval Academy (USNA) is an undergraduate college in Annapolis, Maryland with the mission of educating and commissioning officers for the United States Navy and Marine Corps. The Academy was founded in 1845 and graduated its first class in 1846. The Academy is often referred to as Annapolis, while sports media refer to the Academy as "Navy" and the students as "Midshipmen"; this usage is officially endorsed. During the latter half of the 19th century and the first decades of the 20th, the United States Naval Academy was the primary source of U.S. Navy and Marine Corps officers, with the Class of 1881 being the first to provide officers to the Marine Corps. Graduates of the Academy are also given the option of entering the United States Army or United States Air Force. Most Midshipmen are admitted through the congressional appointment system. The curriculum emphasizes various fields of engineering.

The list is drawn from graduates, non-graduate former Midshipmen, current Midshipmen, and faculty of the Naval Academy. Over 50 U.S. astronauts have graduated from the Naval Academy, more than from any other undergraduate institution. Over 990 noted scholars from a variety of academic fields are Academy graduates, including 45 Rhodes Scholars and 16 Marshall Scholars. Additional notable graduates include 1 President of the United States, 2 Nobel Prize recipients, and 73 Medal of Honor recipients.

Medal of Honor recipients

Academics
"Class year" refers to the alumni's class year, which usually is the same year they graduated. However, in times of war, classes often graduate early. For example, the Class of 1943 actually graduated in 1942.

Astronauts

Athletes

Basketball players

Football players

Olympics competitors

Other sports figures

Attorneys

Businesspeople

U.S. Government

President of the United States

U.S. Cabinet members

Secretaries of military services

U.S. legislators

National Security advisers

Chairmen of the Joint Chiefs of Staff

Vice Chairmen of the Joint Chiefs of Staff

Ambassadors

Governors

Literary figures

Military figures

Medal of Honor recipients
 Bruce McCandless (1911–1968) – received the Medal of Honor during World War II for his heroism on board USS San Francisco, during the Naval Battle of Guadalcanal, November 13, 1942. He retired with the rank of Rear Admiral. McCandless was the father of NASA astronaut, Captain Bruce McCandless II, USN (Ret).

Chiefs of Naval Operations

Commandants of the Marine Corps

Confederate States Navy officers

Union Navy officers

Spanish–American War combatants

World War I combatants

Spanish Civil War combatant

World War II combatants

Korean War combatants

Vietnam War combatants

Lebanon combatants

Panama combatants

Combatants of wars in Iraq and Afghanistan

Scientists

Television figures

Notable fictional alumni

Faculty
These faculty are not graduates, consequently their class year is listed as "NA" for 'not applicable' and they are listed alphabetically by last name.

See also
 Shipmate (magazine)
 Hispanics in the United States Naval Academy
 USNA Out

References
General

Inline citations

External links

 United States Naval Academy Alumni Association & Foundation official website
 Website page for Shipmate (alumni magazine)
 Naval Academy Crew Champions

Annapolis
Academy alumni, famous list
Academy alumni, famous list
 
United States Navy officers